Rose Canyon Lake is located  northeast of Tucson, Arizona in the Santa Catalina Mountains on Mount Lemmon.

Fish species
 Rainbow Trout
 Brown Trout

Gallery

References

External links
 Information on Rose Canyon Lake
 Arizona Fishing Locations Map
 Rose Canyon Lake Campground Reservations
 Video of Rose Canyon Lake

Reservoirs in Pima County, Arizona
Reservoirs in Arizona